Freedom High School is a  large urban, public high school located in Bethlehem Township in the Lehigh Valley region of eastern Pennsylvania. Freedom High School is one of the two public high schools operated by the Bethlehem Area School District. It is located at 3149 Chester Avenue in Bethlehem Township.

As of the 2021-22 school year, Freedom High School had an enrollment of 1,868 students, according to National Center for Education Statistics data. The school employed 101.8 teachers on an  basis for a student-teacher ratio of 18.35.

Freedom High School students may choose to attend the Bethlehem Area Vocational-Technical School for training in the construction and mechanical trades.

Athletics

Freedom High School competes athletically in the Eastern Pennsylvania Conference (EPC) in the District XI division of the Pennsylvania Interscholastic Athletic Association. It holds the record for the most Lehigh Valley Conference championships in boys volleyball.

In boys athletics, Freedom participates in football, basketball, golf, ice hockey, soccer, baseball, tennis, volleyball, lacrosse, swimming, wrestling, diving, rifle, track and field and cross country. In girls athletics, Freedom sponsors basketball, soccer, lacrosse, golf, cheerleading, tennis, volleyball, rifle, track and field, cross country, field hockey, swimming, and diving teams.

The Freedom High School football, soccer, and field hockey teams play their home games at Frank Banko Field at Bethlehem Area School District Stadium, one of the largest high school stadiums in the state with a capacity of 14,000. Soccer and lacrosse teams also use the newly added Turf Field, which was built in 2016 as an alternate home stadium.

Notable alumni
 Afa Anoa'i Jr., former WWE professional wrestler
 Lisa Boscola, Pennsylvania state senator
 Dwayne Johnson, actor, professional wrestler under the ring name "The Rock"
 Daniel Dae Kim, actor, Lost and Hawaii Five-0, producer The Good Doctor
 Jack Linn, former professional football player, Cincinnati Bengals, Detroit Lions, and Indianapolis Colts 
 Michael Pocalyko, business executive and novelist

References

External links
Official website
Freedom High School athletics official website
The Freedom Forum, Freedom High School student newspaper
Freedom High School on Facebook
Freedom High School athletics on Twitter
Freedom High School profile at U.S. News & World Report
Freedom High School sports coverage at The Express-Times''

1967 establishments in Pennsylvania
Bethlehem, Pennsylvania
Educational institutions established in 1967
Public high schools in Pennsylvania
Schools in Lehigh County, Pennsylvania
Schools in Northampton County, Pennsylvania